William R. "Bo" Brown (born November 8, 1949) is an American politician serving as a member of the Mississippi House of Representatives from the 70th district. Elected in November 2019, he assumed office on January 7, 2020.

Education 
Brown earned a Bachelor of Arts degree in political science from Tennessee State University and a Master of Public Policy and Administration from Jackson State University. He was also a postgraduate at Santa Clara University.

Career 
From 1967 to 1971, Brown worked as a teacher and coach in the Jackson Public School District. He later served as a community relations specialist for the United States Department of Justice. From 1972 to 1983, he was a program manager at the United States Department of Housing and Urban Development. He was a radio broadcaster for WOKJ and WKXI-FM before becoming an insurance agent at New York Life. Brown has since worked as a financial representative for the Modern Woodmen of America and served as a member of the Jackson City Council. He was elected to the Mississippi House of Representatives in November 2019 and assumed office on January 7, 2020.

References 

Living people
1949 births
Democratic Party members of the Mississippi House of Representatives
Tennessee State University alumni
Jackson State University alumni